Boys From County Hell is a 2020 vampire comedy horror film.

Plot
Set in Six Mile Hill, a fictional backwater town, whose only claim to fame is that Bram Stoker stayed there once and based Dracula on the local legend of Abhartach.  When Abhartach is awakened after the cairn over his remains is demolished due to the preparation for bypass already unpopular with the locals, the construction team that demolished the cairn must set out to make it right.

Cast
Jack Rowan as Eugene Moffat
Nigel O'Neill as Francie Moffat
Louisa Harland as Claire McCann
Michael Hough as SP McCauley
John Lynch as George Bogue
Fra Free as William Bogue
Jordan Renzo as Christian
Lalor Roddy as Elliott
Morgan C. Jones as Charlie Harte
Andrea Irvine as Pauline Bogue
Robert Strange as Abhartach
Marty Maguire as Gabriel
Kathy Monahan as Marie McCann
Emma Paetz as Michelle
David Pearse as Cathal
Stella McCusker as Pearl
Conor Grimes as Thomas
Bronagh Elmore as Eugene's mum
Parnell Scott as teenage boy
Ellie McKay as teenage girl
Liam Miley as himself
Steven Miller as himself

Production
The film is directed by Chris Baugh, who also co-wrote the film with Brendan Mullin, expanding on a previous short film of the same name. Screen Ireland and Northern Ireland Screen were among the funders of the film.

Release
Boys From County Hell received its world premiere at the 2020 Tribeca Film festival.

Critical reception
Writing in The Guardian, Phil Hoad found that the film, although inventive and amusing, did not always successfully mesh its comedy and horror aspects. Jordan King in Empire magazine also applauded its inventiveness, but also praised the depth of characterisation, describing it as "a playful yet surprisingly poignant vampire yarn that takes on folklore, familial turmoil, and the perils of poor town-planning with aplomb."

Accolades
At the 2021 Neuchâtel International Fantastic Film Festival, Baugh and the film won the jury prize for best European Fantastic Film.

References

External links

2020 horror films
2020 comedy horror films
Northern Irish films
British comedy horror films
British supernatural horror films
Vampire comedy films
English-language Irish films
2020s English-language films
2020s British films